Grigorov (Bulgarian: Григоров) is a Bulgarian masculine surname; its feminine counterpart is Grigorova. It may refer to
Anri Grigorov (born 1964), Bulgarian sprinter
Antoniya Grigorova (born 1986), Bulgarian cross-country skier 
Bozhidar Grigorov (born 1945), Bulgarian football player
Chudomir Grigorov (born 1989), Bulgarian football defender 
Kristiyan Grigorov (born 1990), Bulgarian football centre-back 
Mario Grigorov, Bulgarian composer and concert pianist
Mariya Grigorova (born 1996), Kazakhstani alpine skier
Miroslav Grigorov (born 1982), Bulgarian football goalkeeper 
Rayna Grigorova (born 1931), Bulgarian artistic gymnast
Stamen Grigorov (1878–1945), Bulgarian physician and microbiologist
Grigorov Glacier in Antarctica named after Stamen
Stanislav Grigorov (born 1968), Bulgarian wrestler
Stoyan Grigorov (born 1997), Bulgarian football midfielder
Viktoriya Grigorova (born 1990), Bulgarian volleyball player
Vyachaslaw Hryharaw (born 1982), Belarusian football coach and former player

Bulgarian-language surnames
Patronymic surnames
Surnames from given names